Joseph Lolley (born 25 August 1992) is an English winger who plays for Sydney FC. He has also represented his country at England C level and University level.

Club career

Early career
Born in Redditch, Lolley was part of Birmingham City's academy until the age of 16. He then moved to Bromsgrove Rovers, but made his name with Midland Combination side Littleton, scoring 88 goals in 83 games.

Kidderminster Harriers
In July 2013, following a successful trial, Lolley signed a one-year contract with Conference Premier side Kidderminster Harriers. After a strong start to the season, Lolley scored his first Harriers goal in his second appearance, a 3–1 win over Chester. Lolley went on to score 9 league goals in 21 league appearances, and also 2 goals in 4 appearances in the FA Cup. Kidderminster won every single game that Lolley scored in. In his last league game for the Harriers, he scored a hat-trick against Salisbury City, in his last game for the Harriers, he scored the winning goal in a 3–2 FA Cup 3rd Round replay away to Peterborough United. Kidderminster received an offer from Peterborough United, but Lolley rejected the move.

Huddersfield Town
On 15 January 2014, just one day after scoring the goal that knocked Peterborough out of the FA Cup, Lolley joined Championship side Huddersfield Town for an undisclosed fee. He made his début as a substitute in the 5–1 defeat by Leeds United at Elland Road on 1 February 2014. On 3 May 2014, Lolley made his first start for the Terriers where he scored the first goal in the 4–1 victory over Watford in the 46th minute and also claimed two assists which was the last game of the season. On 14 March 2015, Lolley scored his second league goal for Huddersfield in a 1–1 away draw at Birmingham City. His first home goal for the Terriers was the equalising goal in the 2–2 draw against Blackburn Rovers on 25 April 2015.

On 25 September, Lolley joined Scunthorpe United on an initial one-month loan. After making 6 appearances on loan for the Iron, he along with his teammate Murray Wallace were recalled on 1 November.

Nottingham Forest
On 31 January 2018, Lolley signed a four-and-a-half-year contract with Nottingham Forest for an undisclosed fee. He was one of six additions to the Forest squad on deadline day. He scored his first goal for Forest in a 5–2 win at QPR on 24 February 2018.

On 3 May 2019 he was crowned Nottingham Forest's Player of the Season for the 2018–19 season. He also won Forest's Goal of the Season award for a long range strike against his boyhood club Aston Villa in a thrilling match that would finish 5-5. He also provided four assists in this game.

Lolley's first goal of the 2019–20 season came in a 3–0 victory against Birmingham City on 17 August 2019, his fifth career goal against Aston Villa's local rivals.

In August 2022, Lolley was training with the club's U23 side and was looking for a move away from the club.

Sydney FC
On 15 August 2022, it was announced that Lolley had signed a two-year deal with A–League side Sydney FC. Joe Lolley scored his first goal against Western United

International career
As an England and Great Britain International, Lolley has represented his country at both University Level and semi-professional level. In the summer of 2013 he was selected by the Great Britain University team to play at the 2013 World University Games in Russia where GB went on to reach the final winning the silver medal. He then made his debut for the England C team in a 2–2 friendly match with the Czech Republic U21s in November 2013 during his time at Kidderminster.

Personal life
Lolley studied Sports Coaching at the University of Central Lancashire.

Lolley also takes a keen interest in politics, and would often use his now deleted Twitter account to discuss current affairs. He has supported increasing rates of income tax for high earners.

Lolley is also a dog lover. He visited the Soi Dog Foundation in Thailand in June 2019, and also has his own black Labrador named Bear.

Career statistics

Honours
Nottingham Forest
EFL Championship play-offs: 2022

Individual
 Nottingham Forest Player of the Season 2018–19
 Nottingham Forest Goal of the Season 2018–19

References

External links
 

1992 births
Living people
Sportspeople from Redditch
English footballers
Association football forwards
Association football wingers
Littleton F.C. players
Kidderminster Harriers F.C. players
Huddersfield Town A.F.C. players
Scunthorpe United F.C. players
Nottingham Forest F.C. players
Sydney FC players
Premier League players
English Football League players
National League (English football) players
Universiade silver medalists for Great Britain
Universiade medalists in football
Medalists at the 2013 Summer Universiade
English expatriate footballers
Expatriate soccer players in Australia
English expatriate sportspeople in Australia
A-League Men players